The Flying Fool or just Flying Fool is a 1925 American silent comedy-drama film directed by Frank S. Mattison. It starred actor-stunt pilot Richard Grace and Wanda Hawley.

The film has been released on DVD as a double feature with a 1929 aviation film The Cloud Patrol.

Cast
Gaston Glass - Jack Bryan
Wanda Hawley - The Bride
Dick Grace -
Mary Land -
Eddie Harris - Phinneas Gibbs
Maryland - The Bride's mother
Dick Sutherland - The skipper of Jack's Yacht
Dorothy Vernon - Mrs. Gibbs

References

External links

1925 films
American aviation films
American silent feature films
Films based on short fiction
1925 comedy-drama films
American black-and-white films
Films directed by Frank S. Mattison
1920s American films
Silent American comedy-drama films
1920s English-language films